The 1997 Trophée des Champions was a football match held at Stade de la Méditerranée, Béziers on 23 July 1997 that saw  1996–97 Division 1 champions AS Monaco FC defeat 1997 Coupe de France winners OGC Nice 5–2.

Match details

See also
1997–98 French Division 1

1997–98 in French football
1997
AS Monaco FC matches
OGC Nice matches
July 1997 sports events in Europe
Sport in Béziers